Richard Mapuata N'Kiambi Esola (born 27 February 1965) is a retired Zaire international footballer, who played as a forward.

Club career
Born in Kinshasa, Mapuata began his career with Cercle Sportif Imana. He moved to play in the Belgian Pro League at the age of 20, signing with Standard Liège. One year later, he would join Portuguese Liga side C.F. Os Belenenses for two seasons.  While with Belenenses, Mapuata scored the goal in a famous UEFA Cup victory against FC Barcelona.

He finished his playing career in the Swiss first division, playing for AC Bellinzona and FC Aarau.

International career
Mapuata played for Zaire at the 1988 Africa Cup of Nations finals.

Personal
His son, Cédric, is a retired professional footballer.

References

External links

1965 births
Living people
Footballers from Kinshasa
Democratic Republic of the Congo footballers
Democratic Republic of the Congo expatriate footballers
Democratic Republic of the Congo international footballers
1988 African Cup of Nations players
Primeira Liga players
Standard Liège players
C.F. Os Belenenses players
AC Bellinzona players
FC Aarau players
Expatriate footballers in Switzerland
Expatriate footballers in Portugal
Expatriate footballers in Belgium
Democratic Republic of the Congo expatriate sportspeople in Switzerland
Democratic Republic of the Congo expatriate sportspeople in Portugal
Democratic Republic of the Congo expatriate sportspeople in Belgium
Association football forwards